"Destrozado y sin control" is the first single from the album of the same name by the Peruvian singer and model Shaw. The video was released on May 9, 2010 by MTV Latin America.

Commercial performance
Being the debut single by Shaw, it launched her into stardom. It quickly entered the charts in Perú and began being played all over Latin America on MTV. The song entered the top 20 charts in Perú.

Viña Del Mar Festival
In 2011, Shaw was chosen to represent Perú at the Festival de Viña del Mar where she chose this song for the international song competition. It was well received by the judges with Noel Schajris from Sin Bandera stating he thought it was one of, if not, the best of the competition. She made it all the way to the finals and ended up in second place.

Charts

References

 

2010 singles
Leslie Shaw songs
2010 songs